James Henry Keith Stewart (22 October 1783 – 18 July 1836) was a Scottish Tory Member of Parliament.

Stewart was a younger son of John Stewart, 7th Earl of Galloway and his second wife, Anne Dashwood.

He represented Wigtown Burghs 1812–1821. In 1828, he became Assistant Secretary to the Treasury upon the premature decease of William Hill, and held that post until 22 January 1836, dying later that year.

References

External links 
 

1783 births
1836 deaths
Scottish Tory MPs (pre-1912)
UK MPs 1812–1818
UK MPs 1818–1820
UK MPs 1820–1826
Younger sons of earls
19th-century Scottish people
Members of the Parliament of the United Kingdom for Scottish constituencies